Madurai Ponnu Chennai Paiyan is a 2008 Indian Tamil language romantic drama film directed by A. C. Rajasekaran. The film stars S. S. R. Pankaj Kumar and Thejamai, with R. Sundarrajan, Manobala, Santhana Bharathi, Arun Pandian, Nizhalgal Ravi, Karate Raja, Pandu and S. B. Muthubharathi playing supporting roles. The film, produced S. B. Muthubharathi and P. Tamil Selvi, had musical score by Kanmani Raja and was released in 2008.

Plot

Visa who is from Madurai joins a secondary school as a plus-two student in Chennai. Her father has just died a few days ago when they moved to Chennai and Visa lives with her mother Meenakshi and her little brother. Visa and her family have the strong support of her two uncles who are bigwigs in Madurai. Her classmate Surya, the son of the famous film editor Balan, helps her in studies. Surya and Visa eventually fall in love with each other. In the meantime, her uncles want Visa to marry their relative Maruthupandi, a hot-blooded village brute, after she finished her studies.

When Meenakshi discovers their love affair, Meenakshi doesn't allow her daughter Visa to go to school. Surya is worried about Visa and he meets her in her house. Meenakshi then threatens to commit suicide if she cannot keep the promise she made to her uncles and Visa finally accepts to forget him. The next day, she insults Surya and begs him to forget her. A distraught Surya attempts to commit suicide but he is saved by his friends. Balan decides to talk to her family in Madurai for his son's marriage but they refuse and are hell-bent on saving their family's prestige.

Thereafter, the two families have a verbal fight in Chennai, the two lovers begin vomiting blood and faint on the spot. They are rushed to the hospital and the two families accept to arrange their marriage if they survived. Surya and Visa were, in fact, faking their suicide. The film ends Surya and Visa returning to school and eagerly waiting for their marriage.

Cast

S. S. R. Pankaj Kumar as Surya
Thejamai as Visa (Visalakshi)
R. Sundarrajan as Manmadarajan
Manobala as Bala Nair
Santhana Bharathi as Doctor
Arun Pandian as Visa's uncle
Nizhalgal Ravi as Balan
Karate Raja as Maruthupandi
Pandu as Doctor
S. B. Muthubharathi as Visa's uncle
Kovai Senthil as Restaurant owner
Nellai Siva as Maths teacher
Bayilvan Ranganathan
Muthukaalai as Muthukalai
Sivanarayanamoorthy as Restaurant owner
Master Bharath as Nandhu
Vijay Ganesh as Vaidhyanathan
Sabitha Anand as Meenakshi
Shanthi Anand as Maami
T. R. Latha as Surya's grandmother
Muthu Prakash as Madhan
Nijin as Amid
Anbarasan as Anbu
Lakshmisri Prasad as Kamala
Sharmili as Ambika
D. Raja in a guest appearance
Laksha in a special appearance
Bharathy in a special appearance
Vinutha Lal in a special appearance

Production
A. C. Rajasekaran made his directorial debut with  Madurai Ponnu Chennai Paiyan under the banner of Velu Thevar Films. S. S. R. Pankaj Kumar, the grandson of S. S. Rajendran, signed to play the lead role while Thejamai, the granddaughter of yesteryear comedy actress Bindu Ghosh, was cast to play the heroine.

Soundtrack

The film score and the soundtrack were composed by Kanmani Raja. The soundtrack features 8 tracks.

References

2008 films
2000s Tamil-language films
2008 romantic drama films
Indian romantic drama films
2008 directorial debut films